Jubal may refer to:

People
 Jubal (Bible), named in the Book of Genesis as the father of musicians
 Jubal (footballer) (born 1993), Brazilian footballer
 Jubal Brown (born c. 1974), controversial video producer and multi-media artist
 Jubal Early (1816–1894), Confederate general in the American Civil War

In fiction
 Jubal Harshaw, in the novel Stranger in a Strange Land by Robert A. Heinlein
 Jubal Droad, protagonist of the science fiction novel Maske: Thaery by Jack Vance
 Jubal Early, a character in the Firefly TV series
 Jubal, a slave trader and crime lord in the Thieves' World universe

Other uses
 Jubal, Iran, a village
 Jubal (film), a 1956 American Western film

See also
 Jubal A. Early House, a historic home and archaeological site located near Boones Mill, Franklin County, Virginia
 
 Jabal (disambiguation)